Pyay United Futsal Club is a Myanmar Futsal club. They currently play in the Myanmar Futsal League. They are current champion. In July 2017, They play AFF Futsal Club Championship for the first time.

Current players

Honours

Domestic Leagues
Myanmar Futsal League
 Winners (1): 2017
 Runner-up (1): 2016

See also

External links 
squad list.pdf

Futsal clubs in Myanmar
Futsal clubs established in 2014
2014 establishments in Myanmar